The 1982 Cork Senior Hurling Championship was the 94th staging of the Cork Senior Hurling Championship since its establishment by the Cork County Board in 1887. The draw for the opening round fixtures took place at the Cork Convention on 31 January 1982. The championship began on 1 May 1982 and ended on 10 October 1982.

St. Finbarr's entered the championship as the defending champions.

The final was played on 10 October 1982 at Páirc Uí Chaoimh in Cork, between St. Finbarr's and Blackrock, in what was their first meeting in the final in three years. St. Finbarr's won the match by 2-17 to 3-09 to claim their 22nd championship title overall and a third successive title.

John Cremin was the championship's top scorer with 0-27.

Team changes

To Championship

Promoted from the Cork Intermediate Hurling Championship
 Newtownshandrum

Results

First round

Second round

Quarter-finals

Semi-finals

Final

Championship statistics

Top scorers

Top scorer overall

Top scorers in a single game

References

Cork Senior Hurling Championship
Cork Senior Hurling Championship